Shelbyville Municipal Airport  is a city-owned public-use airport located four miles (6 km) north of the central business district of Shelbyville, a city in Bedford County, Tennessee, United States.

In 2022, Middle Tennessee State University announced it would relocate its aviation training from Murfreesboro Municipal Airport to Shelbyville, investing $62 million in the project.

Facilities and aircraft 

For the 12-month period ending October 26, 2004, the airport had 38,000 aircraft operations, an average of 104 per day: 98% general aviation, 2% air taxi and <1% military. There are 52 aircraft based at this airport: 92% single-engine, 2% multi-engine, 4% helicopter and 2% ultralight.

References

External links 
BOMAR FIELD-SHELBYVILLE - SYI at Tennessee DOT

Airports in Tennessee
Buildings and structures in Bedford County, Tennessee
Transportation in Bedford County, Tennessee